Millane is a surname. Notable people with this surname include:

Darren Millane (1965–1991), Australian-rules football player
Grace Millane (1996–2018), English tourist murdered in New Zealand
Rick Millane, New Zealand engineer

See also 
 Millanes, Spanish municipality